Denis Cohen may refer to:

 Denis P. Cohen, local politician in Philadelphia
 Denis Cohen (composer), French composer, Professor of orchestration at the CNSM in Paris